Ramkrishna Mahato Government Engineering College (RKMGEC), formerly Purulia Government Engineering College (PGEC), is an engineering college located in Purulia, West Bengal, India. It offers undergraduate (B.Tech.) engineering degree courses affiliated to the Maulana Abul Kalam Azad University of Technology (MAKAUT). The institution is regulated, operated and administered by the Government of West Bengal.

Academics
RKMGEC offers four-year under-graduate degree courses in the various disciplines.

 Civil engineering
 Mechanical engineering
 Electrical engineering
 Computer science and engineering
 Electronics and communication engineering

Admission
The candidates are admitted on the basis of the West Bengal Joint Entrance Examination (WBJEE) rankings. B.Tech. courses have a provision of 10% lateral entry at the second-year level through West Bengal Joint Entrance Examination for Lateral Entry (JELET).

Student Life

RKMGEC Hostels 
RKMGEC provides four hostels on campus. Out of them two are for male boarders and the other two for female boarders.

The hostels are as follows:

 Old Girl's Hostel
 New Girl's Hostel
 Old Boy's Hostel
 New Boy's Hostel

Each hostel has its own mess managed by own duly elected mess committee.

See also

References

External links
 
University Grants Commission
National Assessment and Accreditation Council

Engineering colleges in West Bengal
Universities and colleges in Purulia district
Colleges affiliated to West Bengal University of Technology
Educational institutions established in 2016
2016 establishments in West Bengal